Tiger dance is a traditional performing art in which persons wearing tiger costumes dance by themselves or with others.

Asia

Indonesia
Reog Ponorogo of Ponorogo, Java

India
 Puliyattam - Tamil nadu
 Pilivesa | Huli Vesha - Tulu Nadu region spanning the Indian states of Karnataka and Kerala.
 Puli Kali - Kerala
 Baagh Naach - Subarnapur district,  Ganjam district, Odisha
  Manavi Vagh (Human Tiger) - Nagpur, Maharashtra

Nepal
 Baagh Naach of Newa People of Nepal

China
 Tiger dance of Hainan
 Tiger dance of Henan
 Tiger dance of Lo Wu, Northern District, Hong Kong
 Tiger dance of Yongji, Shanxi

Japan
 Tiger dance of Kamaishi, Iwate
 Tiger dance of Ōfunato, Iwate
 Tiger dance of Shizuoka prefecture
 Tiger dance of Yokosuka, Kanagawa

Thailand
 Tiger dance of Bangkok
 Tiger dance of Lampang
 Tiger dance of Nakhon Sawan

See also
 Lion dance
 Sagaan Ubgen, who performs the tiger dance in Buddhist cham

References

Dances of Japan
Dances of India
Tigers in popular culture
Ritual animal disguise